Shaft is a series of television films that aired along with Hawkins and other TV films during 1973–74 television season on The New CBS Tuesday Night Movies. Broadcast every third week, the series is a continuation of the three films beginning with Shaft (1971), starring Richard Roundtree as private detective John Shaft and Ed Barth as Al Rossi; Barth replaces Angelo Gnazzo, who portrayed the character in Shaft's Big Score! (1972).

Because it was aired on over-the-air television, CBS felt that the narrative needed to be toned down. Now instead of opposing the police, Shaft worked with them, creating conflicts with Hawkins starring cinema legend James Stewart, another police series with a starkly different viewership. The show was cancelled after one season. Contemporary analysts suggested that since the two shows—Shaft and Hawkins—appealed to vastly different audience bases, alternating them only served to confuse fans of both series, giving neither one the time to build up a large viewership. A further contributor to its ratings failure was competition from other crime drama series starring African-American private investigators, NBC's Tenafly and ABC's Get Christie Love!. Richard Roundtree himself has publicly expressed his disdain for the small-screen version of Shaft.

Episodes

Cast and characters
 Richard Roundtree as Det. John Shaft:
 A private detective working with the New York Police Department (NYPD). Roundtree reprises his role from the theatrical Shaft film series.
 Ed Barth as Lt. Al Rossi:
 An NYPD police lieutenant working with Shaft. Barth replaces Angelo Gnazzo, who portrayed the character in Shaft's Big Score! (1972).
 This table only shows characters that have appeared in three or more films in the series.
 A dark grey cell indicates that the character was not in the film or that the character's presence in the film has yet to be announced.

References

External links
 
 TV Party: "Shaft" on TV
 Steve Aldous Guide to Shaft TV Series 1973-4

CBS original programming
Live action television shows based on films
Television series based on adaptations
Shaft (franchise)
1973 American television series debuts
1974 American television series endings
1970s American crime drama television series
Television shows set in New York City
American detective television series